The Long Island-class escort carrier was a two-ship class, originally listed as "AVG" (Aircraft Escort Vessels). They were converted from type C3-class merchant ships.

The first ship of the class—, originally AVG-1, later ACV-1 then CVE-1—was launched on 11 January 1940, and served in the United States Navy through World War II.

The second and last ship of the class——was launched on 14 December 1939, and served in the Royal Navy through World War II. It is also listed in U.S. Navy records as BAVG-1; the "B" presumably stood for "British".

See also

List of ship classes of the Second World War

References

Bibliography

Escort aircraft carrier classes
 
World War II escort aircraft carriers of the United States
World War II escort carriers of the United Kingdom